Secăria is a commune in Prahova County, Muntenia, Romania. It is composed of a single village, Secăria.

References

Communes in Prahova County
Localities in Muntenia